The Women's Super Basketball League (WSBL) is the top-tier semi-professional women's basketball league in Taiwan.

History

Current clubs 
 Cathay Life (國泰人壽)
 Chunghwa Telecom (中華電信)
 Taiwan Power (台灣電力)
 Taiyuan Textile (台元紡織)

Champions

Regular season standings 
The regular season standings are listed below:

Postseason standings 
The league champions and other postseason standings are listed below:

See also 
 Chinese Taipei women's national basketball team
 List of basketball leagues
 Sport in Taiwan
 Super Basketball League (SBL)

References

External links 
  

Taiwan
Basketball leagues in Taiwan
Sports leagues established in 2004
2004 establishments in Taiwan
League
Professional sports leagues in Taiwan
Women's sports leagues in Taiwan